Tim Wittman is a retired American soccer player who is currently the assistant coach with the Johns Hopkins University women's soccer team.  He spent his entire professional career playing indoor soccer in the first and second Major Indoor Soccer League, National Professional Soccer League and Continental Indoor Soccer League.  He also coached in the Major Indoor Soccer League.

Player
Wittman attended Calvert Hall College High School where he was a 1980 All American high school soccer player.  In December 1980 the Tampa Bay Rowdies drafted him in the third round of the NASL draft, but he never played for them. In 1981, the Baltimore Blast of the Major Indoor Soccer League drafted Wittman.  He would spend ten seasons with the Blast before moving to the San Diego Sockers in 1991.  He returned to Baltimore in 1992 to play for the Baltimore Spirit of the National Professional Soccer League.  The Spirit released him in May 1995.  On June 17, 1995, the Seattle SeaDogs selected Wittman with their second pick of the Continental Indoor Soccer League draft.  On June 21, 1995, the SeaDogs traded Wittman to the Pittsburgh Stingers in exchange for Troy Fabiano and several 1995 and 1996 draft choices.  In August 1995, he was suspended by the league after a physical altercation with a referee.  He returned to the CISL in 1996, this time with the Detroit Neon.  Wittman was inducted into the Maryland Soccer Hall of Fame in 2004.

Coach
On December 22, 2002, the Blast hired Wittman as an assistant coach.  He became the head coach a year later.  On March 18, 2006, Wittman assaulted a referee during a game against the California Cougars.  He was arrested and charged with battery.  On April 24, 2006, MISL suspended Wittman from the league for two years.  In 2008, he joined the Johns Hopkins University women's soccer team as an assistant coach.

References

External links
Johns Hopkins coaching bio
Baltimore Blast All Time Roster
MISL stats

1963 births
American soccer coaches
American soccer players
Baltimore Blast (1980–1992) players
Baltimore Spirit players
Continental Indoor Soccer League players
Detroit Neon players
Living people
Major Indoor Soccer League (1978–1992) players
Major Indoor Soccer League (2001–2008) coaches
National Professional Soccer League (1984–2001) players
Pittsburgh Stingers players
San Diego Sockers (original MISL) players
Soccer players from Baltimore
Tampa Bay Rowdies draft picks
Association football defenders